"The Hand Clap" is the second single by American rapper Hurricane Chris from his debut studio album, 51/50 Ratchet (2007). The song features a guest vocals from Big Poppa of Ratchet City, while it's produced by Phunk Dawg.

Music video
The music video was premiered on BET's 106 & Park on September 18, 2007.

Charts

References

2007 singles
2007 songs
Hurricane Chris (rapper) songs
RCA Records singles
Music videos directed by Dale Resteghini
Hip hop dance
J Records singles